The Black Dragon is a comic book series by Chris Claremont and John Bolton that was originally published by Epic Comics in the 1980s, and later published as a graphic novel by Titan Books.

Contents
The Black Dragon is a medieval fantasy of magick and encroaching evil set in England shortly after the Norman Conquest.

Reception
Jonathan Palmer reviewed The Black Dragon for Arcane magazine, rating it an 8 out of 10 overall. Palmer comments that "ignore the corny appearance of Robin Hood and his band of merry men and let Claremont's voluminous text and Bolton's inspirational yet superbly controlled artwork transport you back to the time of legend".

References

Comics by Chris Claremont
Defunct American comics
Marvel Comics graphic novels